Luna Park was a trolley park (a type of amusement park) in Cleveland, Ohio, USA, from 1905 to 1929.

Specifications 

Constructed by Frederick Ingersoll, the park occupied a hilly  site bounded by Woodland Avenue, Woodhill, Mt. Carmel (originally Ingersoll Road), and East 110th Street and included roller coasters, carousels, a fun house, a Ferris wheel, a roller rink, a shoot-the-chutes ride, a concert shell, a dance hall, bumper cars, a baseball field, and a 20,000-seat stadium (unofficially called "Luna Bowl", destroyed by fire in August, 1929Clipped From The Akron Beacon Journal) in which American football was played. 

On May 18, 1905, Cleveland's Luna Park became the second Ingersoll park of that name (out of 44) to have opened before his death in 1927, and the second amusement park (after Luna Park, Pittsburgh, which opened weeks earlier) to be covered with electrical lighting.

History 
The monetary demands of upgrading and maintaining his embryonic chain of amusement parks forced Ingersoll, the original owner of Cleveland's Luna Park, to declare bankruptcy in 1908; Ingersoll was forced to sell his Cleveland park to Matthew Bramley, an original investor in (and, later, owner of) Ingersoll's Luna Park Amusement Company who built the Cleveland Trinidad Paving Company into the largest paving company in the world. Bramley added rides to Luna Park as its popularity as a trolley park grew, in part because beer was sold on the park grounds. 

After the passage of the Eighteenth Amendment to the United States Constitution and the beginning of Prohibition (1920), a primary source of revenue was removed as the park's popularity waned. Bramley officially closed the gates to Luna Park in 1929 for the final time as the Great Depression took hold in the United States. The park was beset with incidences of arson, including the fire that destroyed the football stadium, and most of the rides were dismantled and moved to other amusement parks in the early 1930s.

Luna Bowl tenants 

The Cleveland Panthers of the first American Football League and the Cleveland Bulldogs of the National Football League played their home games in Luna Bowl, and (after the dismantling of the amusement rides had begun) the Federal League Cleveland Green Sox, Negro league baseball teams Cleveland Stars (1932), Cleveland Giants (1933), and Cleveland Red Sox (1934) each played their home games at the ballfield that was originally adjacent to the football stadium. On December 12, 1938, the last vestige of the park, the skating rink, was destroyed by fire. In 1940, the Woodhill Homes housing development was built on the park site.

Collegiately, Case School of Applied Science defeated Western Reserve University 7–6 on November 19, 1927 during their annual rivalry football game, played only once at Luna Park.  The winning touchdown was scored by Case's Frank Herzegh.

References

External links

First-year tour of Cleveland's Luna Park
Timeline of additions to Cleveland's Luna Park, 1906-1925
Sanborn map showing parts of Luna Park including athletic field

Amusement parks in Ohio
Culture of Cleveland
Defunct amusement parks in Ohio
Defunct American football venues in the United States
American Football League (1926) venues
Defunct baseball venues in the United States
Negro league baseball venues
History of Cleveland
Sports venues in Cleveland
1905 establishments in Ohio
1929 disestablishments in Ohio
Defunct sports venues in Ohio
Federal League venues